Auro may refer to:

People
Auro de Moura Andrade (1915–1982), Brazilian politician
Auro Roselli (1921–2013), Italian journalist
Auro Jr. (born 1996), Brazilian footballer

Other uses
Auro-3D, 3D audio format
Auro 11.1, cinematic speaker layout
AURO University, Indian private university